Admiral Davenport may refer to:

Dudley Davenport (1919–1990), British Royal Navy rear admiral
Robert Davenport (Royal Navy officer) (1882–1965), British Royal Navy vice admiral
Roy M. Davenport (1909–1987), U.S. Navy rear admiral